John P. Derham House, also known as Loughrea Plantation, is a historic home located at Green Sea in Horry County, South Carolina. It was built about 1900 and is representative of the Victorian Eclectic style.

It was listed on the National Register of Historic Places in 2005.

References

Houses on the National Register of Historic Places in South Carolina
Houses completed in 1900
Houses in Horry County, South Carolina
National Register of Historic Places in Horry County, South Carolina